Mirza Muhammad Siyar (c. 1770 – c. 1840) also known as Baba Siyar was a Chitrali poet and court chronicler who lived during the 18th and 19th centuries. He is considered one of the few great begotten poets of the Hindu Kush region. He composed the famous Shahnamah-i-Chitral.

References

1770 births
19th-century poets
Khowar poets
Persian-language poets
Indian courtiers
1840 deaths
People from Chitral District